Socialist Weekly was an Urdu language newspaper published from Karachi, Pakistan. Socialist Weekly was launched in late 1947 as a continuation of the Sindhi Socialist Weekly. Socialist Weekly carried the symbol of the Indian Socialist Party in its masthead. It became the official organ of the Pakistan Socialist Party when the party was constituted in January 1948. The original editorial board consisted of Mobarak Sagher (chief editor), Munshi Ahmad Din, Siddique Lodhi, Ram Mohan Sinha, Kali Charan and Mohammed Yusuf Khan. Socialist Weekly had a circulation of around 2,500.

References

1947 establishments in Pakistan
Defunct newspapers published in Pakistan
Defunct weekly newspapers
Mass media in Karachi
Weekly newspapers published in Pakistan
Socialist newspapers
Socialism in Pakistan
Publications established in 1947
Publications with year of disestablishment missing
Urdu-language newspapers published in Pakistan